The performing arts in Detroit include orchestra, live music, and theater, with more than a dozen performing arts venues. The stages and old time film palaces are generally located along Woodward Avenue, the city's central thoroughfare, in the Downtown, Midtown, and New Center areas. Some additional venues are located in neighborhood areas of the city. Many of the city's significant historic theaters have been revitalized.

History

Detroit has a long theatrical history, with many venues dating back to the 1920s. The  Detroit Fox Theatre (1928) was the first theater ever constructed with built-in film sound equipment. Commissioned by William Fox and built by architect C. Howard Crane, the ornate Detroit Fox was fully restored in 1988. It is the largest of the nation's Fox Theatres with 5,045 seats. The city has been a place for operatic, symphonic, musical and popular acts since the first part of the twentieth century. Portions of Leonard Bernstein's music for West Side Story, produced by Detroit's Nederlander Organization, were composed on the piano that resides in the library at Cranbrook in the Detroit suburb of Bloomfield Hills. David T. Nederlander's career began after purchasing a 99-year lease on the Detroit Opera House. His son, the organization's chairman, James M. Nederlander, also a Detroit native, coproduced over one hundred famous theatrical classics, including West Side Story, Hello, Dolly!, The King and I, and Fiddler on the Roof. Today, the Nederlander Organization operates Detroit's Fisher Theatre, the Detroit Opera House, and several theaters in other major cities on the Broadway theatre circuit. Organizations such as the Mosaic Youth Theatre support the city's theater community.

During the late 1980s the great old motion picture screens and live performance stages began to be restored. The Fox Theatre, Detroit Opera House (formerly the Grand Circus Theatre; Broadway Capitol Theatre; Paramount Theatre; Capital Theatre), and The Fillmore Detroit (formerly the State Theater; Palms Theater) are notable restorations. The Fillmore Detroit is the site of the annual Detroit Music Awards held in April. Other venues were modernized and expanded such as Orchestra Hall, the home of the world-renowned Detroit Symphony Orchestra. Next to the Detroit Opera House is the restored 1,700-seat Music Hall Center for the Performing Arts (1928) at 350 Madison Avenue, designed by William Kapp and developed by Matilda Dodge Wilson. The Detroit Institute of Arts contains the renovated 1,150-seat Detroit Film Theatre. Smaller sites with long histories in the city were preserved by physically moving the entire structure. In a notable preservation, the Gem Theatre and  Century Theatre were moved (off their foundation) to a new address across from the Music Hall Center in order to construct Comerica Park. Detroit's 1,571-seat Redford Theatre (1928), with its Japanese motifs, is home to the Motor City Theatre Organ Society (MCTOS).

Along with Wayne State University’s  Hilberry Theatre (Wayne State University) in Midtown, the only graduate repertory theater in the nation, Detroit has enjoyed a resurgence in theatrical productions and attendance. In the 2000s, shows ranging from touring musicals to local theater happen nightly and the theaters have sparked a significant increase in nightlife; hospitality ventures serving the area have increased accordingly. With its sports venues and casinos, the Detroit Theater District has helped revitalized high rise residential areas like those surrounding Grand Circus Park and its nearby Foxtown, Greektown, the Cultural Center and New Center area anchored by the 2,089-seat Fisher Theatre.

The city has some surviving historic theaters which have been converted to other uses while others await redevelopment. Albert Kahn and Ernest Wilby designed the Beaux Arts styled National Theatre (1911) with its Moorish entry at 118 Monroe Street which also awaits redevelopment. The 2,200 seat National Theatre is the oldest surviving theater from the city's first theater district. The futuristic Cadillac Centre begins construction on Detroit's historic Monroe block, once a collection of eight antebellum commercial buildings demolished in 1990. C. Howard Crane designed the Neo-Renaissance styled United Artists Theatre Building at 150 Bagley Street slated to become a residential high rise. The 600-seat Stratford Theatre at 4751 W. Vernor Hwy., designed by Joseph P. Jogerst, seated 1,137 when it opened in 1916. The Art Deco styled Stratford Theatre in the West Vernor-Junction Historic District has operated as a retail store since 1985. The ornate Spanish styled Hollywood Theatre (1927) at the corner of Ferdinand and Fort St. was demolished in 1963. When the historic Hollywood opened, it was the city's second largest with 3,400 seats. The Hollywood Barton theatre organ was saved and awaits restoration. There were over 7,000 such organs installed in American theaters from 1915 to 1933, but fewer than forty remain in their original location such as the Barton theater organ in Ann Arbor's Michigan Theatre.

Detroit's performance centers and theaters emanate from the Grand Circus Park Historic District and continue along Woodward Avenue toward the Fisher Theatre in the city's New Center. The Detroit Opera House is located at Broadway and Grand Circus. The east necklace of downtown links Grand Circus and the stadium area to Greektown along Broadway. The east necklace contains a sub-district sometimes called the Harmonie Park District in the Broadway Avenue Historic District which has taken on the renowned legacy of Detroit's music from the 1930s through the 1950s and into the present. Near the Opera House, and emanating from Grand Circus along the east necklace, are other venues including the Music Hall Center for the Performing Arts and the Gem Theatre and Century Club. The historic Harmonie Club and Harmonie Centre are located along Broadway. The Harmonie Park area ends near Gratiot and Randolph.

Performing arts venues

Historic venues awaiting restoration

See also

Caesars Windsor
Grand Riviera Theater
List of concert halls
Music of Detroit
Michigan Building

References

Further reading

External links
Detroit Entertainment District
Detroit Symphony Orchestra: Orchestra Hall
Detroit Opera House: Motopera Theatre
Hilberry Theatre: Wayne State University
Nederlander Detroit: Fisher and Masonic Theatres
Olympia Entertainment: The Fox Theatre and the City Theatre
Studio Theatre: Wayne State University

Theatre in Detroit
Performing arts centers in Michigan
Detroit
Tourist attractions in Detroit
Culture of Detroit
Detroit